The weightlifting tournament at the 2021 Islamic Solidarity Games in Konya was held between 11–15 August 2022. The weightlifting competition took place at TÜYAP Konya International Fair Center in Konya.

The Games were originally scheduled to take place from 20 to 29 August 2021 in Konya, Turkey. In May 2020, the Islamic Solidarity Sports Federation (ISSF), who are responsible for the direction and control of the Islamic Solidarity Games, postponed the games as the 2020 Summer Olympics were postponed to July and August 2021, due to the global COVID-19 pandemic.

Medalists

Men

Women

Medal table

Participating nations
A total of 147 athletes from 24 nations competed in weightlifting at the 2021 Islamic Solidarity Games:

Gallery

References

External links 
Official website
Results book

2021 Islamic Solidarity Games
2021
Islamic Solidarity Games
International weightlifting competitions hosted by Turkey